Maxwell Nicholas Field (born 23 March 1950) is a former English cricketer. Field was a right-handed batsman who bowled right-arm medium pace. He was born in Coventry, Warwickshire.

Playing career
While studying for his degree at Cambridge University, Field made his first-class debut for Cambridge University Cricket Club against Yorkshire in 1974. He made seven further first-class appearances for the university in 1974, the last of which came against Oxford University. In his eight first-class appearances for Cambridge, Field scored 121 runs at an average of 12.10, with a high score of 39 not out. With the ball, he took 24 wickets at a bowling average of 32.58, with best figures of 4/76. In that same season, Field also made his List A debut for Cambridge University against Kent in the 1974 Benson & Hedges Cup. He made two further List A appearances for the university in that competition, against Essex and Surrey. He took 2 wickets in his three matches, which came at an average of 30.00, with best figures of 2/31.

Field also made his debut for Warwickshire in the 1974 season. His first appearance for the county came in a first-class match against the touring Pakistanis. He made just two further first-class appearances for Warwickshire, which came against Surrey in the 1974 County Championship and Worcestershire in the 1975 County Championship. His first limited-overs appearances for the county also came in 1974, in the John Player League against Worcestershire. He made five further List A appearances for the county, the last of which came against Glamorgan in that same competition. His six List A appearances for Warwickshire yielded just 2 wickets, which came at an average of 65.50, with best figures of 1/24.

References

External links
Max Field at ESPNcricinfo
Max Field at CricketArchive

1950 births
Living people
Cricketers from Coventry
Alumni of the University of Cambridge
English cricketers
Cambridge University cricketers
Warwickshire cricketers